Anapatris is a monotypic moth genus in the family Depressariidae. Its only species, Anapatris chersopsamma, is found in Panama. Both the genus and species were described by Edward Meyrick in 1932.

References

Stenomatinae
Monotypic moth genera
Taxa named by Edward Meyrick
Moths of Central America